Established in 1961, Booger Hollow Trading Post was a tourist attraction in Pope County, Arkansas.  A sign near the attraction's entrance read "Population 7...countin' one coon dog". The trading post offered "hillbilly" and locally themed novelties for tourists as well as local goods such as lye-soap, honey, and sorghum. The Boogerhollow Chuckwagon Cafe had standard fare with colorful menu names such as the "boogerburger" and the "boogerdog."

The attraction actually was actually twelve miles from the community of Booger Hollow, Arkansas.  It is also located on a hilltop, instead of within a hollow.

The name of the hollow is derived from a belief in the 1800s that the area where the road through the hollow ran between two cemeteries was haunted.  Booger in this instance is a variant of bogeyman, a mythical creature, ghost, or hobgoblin; also boogerman, or boogieman.

The owner of the Booger Hollow Trading Post decided to sell in 2004, but the new owners never reopened the attraction.  

Currently, Booger Hollow is closed and abandoned.

A popular photo prop was a two-story outhouse.  The lower level was functional but the upper level was perpetually closed "until we git the plummin' figgered out."

References

External links
 A website about Booger Hollow

Ghost towns in Arkansas
Buildings and structures in Pope County, Arkansas
Geography of Pope County, Arkansas